George Iain Murray, 10th Duke of Atholl, DL (19 June 1931 – 27 February 1996), known as Wee Iain, was a Scottish peer and landowner.

Background and education
Murray was the only surviving child of Lieutenant-Colonel George Anthony Murray (1907–1945), who was killed in action in the Second World War, and the Honourable Angela Pearson (1910–1981), daughter of The 2nd Viscount Cowdray. He was a great-grandson of Sir George Murray, grandson of the Right Reverend George Murray, son of the Right Reverend Lord George Murray, second son of The 3rd Duke of Atholl, who in turn was eldest son of renowned Scottish Jacobite Lord George Murray. Through his American great-grandfather, Brigadier General Daniel M. Frost of the Confederate States Army, he was a descendant of the Winthrop family and a distant cousin to former Secretary of State John Kerry.

He attended both Eton and Christ Church, Oxford, before succeeding the 9th duke, his fourth cousin twice removed, as 10th Duke of Atholl in 1957. With a height of six feet, five inches, he was one of the tallest Scottish peers, leading to the whimsical name of "Wee Iain".

Public life
Atholl inherited an estate of approximately 120,000 acres (496 km2)—although this was a decline from the 190,000 acres (769 km2) in the 19th century, it was still a smaller decline than many other Scottish estates. Under his stewardship, the estate in and around Blair Castle became a significant area for tourism and forestry, on which he was an acknowledged expert and spoke many times in the House of Lords, having been elected a Scottish Representative Peer in 1958. In addition, he resurrected the Atholl Highlanders, the ceremonial private army of the dukedom composed of estate workers and family friends, as a tourist attraction.

He was an active member of the Conservative Monday Club. He also held several business appointments, notably as Chairman of BPM Holdings between 1972 and 1983 and of Westminster Press Group between 1974 and 1996 and as a director of Pearson Longman between 1975 and 1983. In 1980 he was appointed a deputy lieutenant of Perth and Kinross.

Personal life
Atholl died unmarried in February 1996, aged 64, with the titles passing to his second cousin, once removed, John Murray, a South African land surveyor. The day before the death of the 10th Duke, it was announced that he had given Blair Castle and most of his estates to a charitable trust, thus effectively disinheriting his heir. The new duke had indicated he had little interest in leaving South Africa, and though he honoured the land of his origins, said: "I am a South African, not a Scotsman."

References

Sources
 
 Obituary from The Independent 28 February 1996

External links

Pedigree of the 10th Duke of Atholl

1931 births
1996 deaths
Anglo-Scots
110
Scottish people of American descent
Scottish representative peers
Conservative Party (UK) hereditary peers
People educated at Eton College
Alumni of Christ Church, Oxford
George
Deputy Lieutenants in Scotland
20th-century Scottish businesspeople
Dukes of Rannoch
Winthrop family